Andromeda: A Space-Age Tale (Tumannost' Andromedy – Andromeda Nebula) is a science fiction novel by the Soviet writer and paleontologist Ivan Yefremov, written in 1955–1956 and published in 1957. It was translated into English as Andromeda: A Space-Age Tale by George Hanna. The novel predicted some future inventions (borazon, space probe, powered exoskeleton and ion thruster). It was made into a film in 1967, The Andromeda Nebula.

Yefremov's 1958 short story "The Heart of the Serpent" and 1968 novel The Bull's Hour, which is set in the same universe taking place some 200 years later, are considered as its sequels.

Plot summary 
The book portrays Yefremov's conception of a classic communist utopia set in a distant future. Throughout the novel, the author's attention is focused on the social and cultural aspects of the society, and the struggle to conquer vast cosmic distances. There are several principal heroes, including a starship captain, two scientists, a historian, and an archeologist. Though the world described in the novel is intended to be ideal, there is an attempt to show a conflict and its resolution with a voluntary self-punishment of a scientist whose reckless experiment caused damage. There's also a fair amount of action in the episodes where the crew of the starship fight alien predators.

In the novel, several civilizations across our galaxy, including Earth, are united in the Great Circle, whose members exchange and relay scientific and cultural information. Notably, faster-than-light travel or communication does not exist in the time portrayed in the book, and one of the minor plot lines examines a failed attempt to overcome this limitation. The radio transmissions around the Great Circle are pictured as requiring a tremendous amount of energy, and are thus infrequent.

One of the main plot lines follows the crew of the spacecraft Tantra led by Captain Erg Noor, dispatched to investigate the sudden radio silence of one of the nearby Great Circle planets. The crew travels to the planet, and discovers that most life on it has been destroyed by unsafe experimentation with radioactivity. On their return journey, the Tantra is scheduled to meet a carrier spacecraft to refuel, but the second ship does not make the rendezvous. The crew attempts the return voyage with meager fuel, but is trapped by the gravitational field of an "iron star" (some form of compact star in modern terms). The crew lands on one of its planets, where they discover the wreck of a previous expedition, as well as a mysterious alien spacecraft. After fighting off the native life-form, the crew retrieve the remaining fuel supplies from the wreck and succeed in returning to earth.

The second major plot line follows Darr Veter, the director of the global space agency as he makes way for a successor and then attempt to find a new job for himself. When his successor voluntarily steps down as punishment for a daring experiment that goes wrong, Veter returns to the position. The book closes with the launch of a new expedition, once again led by Noor, to a pair of new planets that offer the possibility of human colonisation. It is a bittersweet ending, as the cosmonauts themselves will not live long enough to return.

Literary significance and criticism
Critics have accused the heroes of the novel being more of philosophical ideas than live people. Nevertheless, the novel was a major milestone in Soviet science-fiction literature, which, in Stalin's era, had been much more short-sighted (never venturing more than a few decades into the future) and primarily focusing on technical inventions rather than social issues (the so-called "fiction aim theory" for science fiction). Boris Strugatsky wrote:
Yefremov was an ice breaker of a man. He has broken the seemingly unbreakable ice of the "short aim theory". He has shown how one can and should write modern SF, and thus has ushered a new era of Soviet SF. Of course those times were already different, the Stalin Ice Age was nearing its end, and I think that even without Andromeda, Soviet SF would soon start a new course. But the publication of Andromeda has become a symbol of the new era, its banner, in some sense. Without it, the new growth would have been an order of magnitude more difficult, and a thaw in our SF wouldn't have come until later.

Characters

Crew of the first class spaceship Tantra 
(37th Space Expedition)
 Erg Noor, chief of the expedition, spaceship commander
 Nisa Creet, astronavigator
 Pour Hyss, astronomer
 Louma Lasvy, ship's physician
 Eon Thal, biologist
 Ingrid Dietra, astronomer
 Pel Lynn, astronavigator
 Beena Ledd, geologist
 Taron, mechanical engineer
 Ione Marr, teacher of gymnastics, dietary supervisor, storekeeper
 Kay Bear, electronic engineer

Characters of Earth

Men 
 Grom Orme, President of the Astronautical Council
 Diss Ken, his son
 Zieg Zohr, music composer
 Thor Ann, son of Zieg Zohr, Diss Ken's friend
 Mir Ohm, Secretary of the Astronautical Council
 Darr Veter, retiring Director of the Outer Stations
 Mwen Mass, successor to Darr Veter
 Junius Antus, Director of the Electronic Memory Machines
 Kam Amat, Indian scientist (In a former age)
 Liao Lang, palaeontologist
 Renn Bose, physicist
 Cart Sann, painter
 Frith Don, Director of the Maritime Archaeological Expedition
 Sherliss, mechanic to the expedition
 Ahf Noot, prominent surgeon
 Grimm Schar, biologist of the Institute of Nerve Currents
 Zann Senn, poet, historian
 Heb Uhr, soil scientist
 Beth Lohn, mathematician, criminal in exile
 Embe Ong, candidate for Director of the Outer Stations
 Cadd Lite, engineer on Satellite 57

Women 
 Evda Nahl, psychiatrist
 Rhea, her daughter
 Veda Kong, historian
 Miyiko Eigoro, historian, Veda's assistant
 Chara Nandi, biologist, dancer, artist's model
 Onar, girl of the Island of Oblivion
 Eva Djann, astronomer
 Liuda Pheer, psychologist (in a former age)

Extraterrestrial characters 
 Goor Hahn, observer on the diurnal satellite
 Zaph Phthet, Director of External Relations of the planet of 61 Cygni

Notes

Bibliography 

 Jameson, Fredric. "Progress Versus Utopia; or, Can We Imagine the Future?" Science Fiction Studies 9.2 (1982): 147–158.
 Suvin, Darko. "Three World Paradigms for SF: Asimov, Yefremov, Lem." Pacific Quarterly (Moana): An International Review of Arts and Ideas 4.(1979): 271–283.
 Yefremov, Ivan. Andromeda: A Space-Age Tale translated by George Hanna. Moscow: Foreign Language Publishing House, 1959, 444 pp. LCCN: 95207661.
 Yefremov, Ivan. Andromeda: A Space-Age Tale translated by George Hanna. Moscow: Progress Publishers, 1980, 397 pp. . LCCN: 82206351.
 Yefremov, Ivan. Andromeda: A Space-Age Tale. NL: Fredonia Books, August 30, 2004, 384 pp. .

External links 
 Review of Andromeda: A Space-Age Tale

1957 science fiction novels
Molodaya Gvardiya (publisher) books
Novels about extraterrestrial life
Novels by Ivan Yefremov
Russian novels adapted into films
Utopian novels
Soviet science fiction novels